General Sir Ralph Darling, GCH (1772 – 2 April 1858) was a British Army officer who served as Governor of New South Wales from 1825 to 1831. He is popularly described as a tyrant, accused of torturing prisoners and banning theatrical entertainment. Local geographical features named after him include the Darling River and Darling Harbour in Sydney.

Early career
Darling seems to have been unique in the British Army of this period, as he progressed from an enlisted man to become a general officer with a knighthood. Born in Ireland, he was the son of a sergeant in the 45th Regiment of Foot who subsequently gained the unusual reward of promotion to officer rank as a lieutenant. Like most of the small number of former non-commissioned officers in this position, Lieutenant Darling performed only regimental administrative duties. He struggled to support his large family on a subaltern's pay.

Ralph Darling enlisted at the age of fourteen as a private in his father's regiment, and served in the ranks for at least two years on garrison duty in the West Indies. Eventually, as an "act of charity" to the family, young Ralph was granted an officer's commission as an ensign on 15 May 1793, without having to make the usual payment. The new officer soon found opportunities to show his ability, alternating front-line activity and high-level administrative duties, and in August 1796 he was appointed as military secretary to Sir Ralph Abercromby, the British commander-in-chief in the West Indies. By the time he returned to Great Britain in 1802, still aged only twenty-nine, the sergeant's son and one-time private soldier was a highly respected lieutenant-colonel.

During the Napoleonic Wars, Colonel Darling alternated between periods of regimental command and important administrative appointments, leading the 51st Regiment of Foot at the Battle of Corunna and serving as assistant adjutant general during the Walcheren Expedition, before returning to the headquarters at Royal Horse Guards in London, where he served for almost a decade as head of British Army recruiting. In this role, Darling was subsequently promoted to brevet colonel on 25 July 1810, major general on 4 June 1813, and deputy adjutant general in 1814. General Darling was also able to further the careers of his younger brothers Henry and William, and subsequently his nephew Charles; the three brothers all became generals, and Charles also earned a knighthood.

Darling married in 1817. Between February 1819 and February 1824, General Darling commanded the British troops on Mauritius, before serving as acting governor of the colony for the last three years of his stay. In this role, Darling again exhibited his administrative ability, but he also became very unpopular in Mauritius: he was accused of allowing a British frigate to breach quarantine and start an epidemic of cholera, and he then suspended the island's Conseil de Commune when it protested his actions; in reality, however, there was no evidence that the frigate had been carrying cholera, and the opposition to General Darling appears to have been motivated in large part by his vigorous actions against the slave trade, and the fact that British rule in Mauritius was still little more than military occupation of a proud French colony. Notwithstanding the criticism from some quarters, it was largely on account of his service in Mauritius that Darling was appointed the seventh Governor of New South Wales in 1824.

Governor of New South Wales
Darling initiated the construction, from 1826, of the convict-built Great North Road, linking the Hawkesbury settlements around Sydney with those in the Hunter Valley. In 1826 he also defined the Nineteen Counties in accordance with a government order from Lord Bathurst, the Secretary of State in the British parliament; these were the limits of location in the colony of New South Wales. Settlers were only permitted to take up land within these counties. From 1831 the granting of free land ceased and the only land that was to be made available for sale was within the Nineteen Counties.

When Darling was commissioned as governor, the Colony's western boundary – set in 1788 at 135 degrees east longitude – was extended by 6 degrees west to the 129 degrees east longitude. This line of longitude subsequently became the border dividing Western Australia and South Australia. To the south, everything beyond Wilsons Promontory, the southeastern 'corner' of the Australian continent, ceased to be under the control of New South Wales and was placed under the authority of the Lieutenant Governor of Van Diemen's Land. He proclaimed Van Diemen's Land as a separate colony on 3 December in 1825.

Controversies
Darling was a professional soldier, military governor of what was still effectively a penal colony under martial law, and having lived entirely within the authoritarian structure of the army since childhood, he lacked experience in dealing with civilian society. As a result, he came into conflict with the liberal "emancipists" who wished to introduce greater political and social freedom in New South Wales. Their accusations of tyrannical misrule were publicised by opposition newspapers in England and Australia (including the Australian, run by William Wentworth and Robert Wardell).

Darling tended to rely upon like-minded military men for his administration, and it was soon subject to criticism for nepotism and favouritism. That criticism, as well as the accusations of tyrannical rule, could not be stifled. Darling's predecessor, Thomas Brisbane, had ended press censorship, creating in effect press freedom before Darling arrived in the colony. Darling's subsequent attempt to control the press through new legislation failed, because the Chief Justice, Francis Forbes, advised that the measures were not compatible with the laws of England.

It is certainly the case that Darling made land grants to relatives, including his brothers-in-law Henry and William Dumaresq, and others that he favoured, such as George Bowen and Stewart Ryrie, a brother-in law of Darling's first Lieutenant-Governor, William Stewart. Those same favoured people received appointments within his administration. 

In keeping with official policy and the governor's own disciplinarian instincts, Darling's administration certainly strengthened the punitive aspects of transportation. Perhaps the most controversial act of his tenure was the harsh treatment of soldiers Joseph Sudds and Patrick Thompson, who had committed theft in the belief that seven years in an outlying penal colony would be an easier life than two decades of army discipline. As an example to others, the Governor had them placed in irons and assigned to a chain gang, leading to the death of Sudds.

Some believe this death was officially downplayed.  It was stated as having been due to a pre-existing illness which the Governor had not been properly informed about.  However, the incident proved intensely and persistently controversial at the time and formed a major element in the rising career of Mr William Charles Wentworth as a political thorn in the side of the establishment and a leading advocate for the self-government of the Australian colonies.

Wentworth, who was also famous for crossing the Blue Mountains with Blaxland and Lawson, became the Colony's leading political figure of the 1820s-30s.  He called for representative government, the abolition of transportation, freedom of the press and trial by jury.  Wentworth became the most bitter enemy of Governor Ralph Darling and his 'exclusives' led by the wealthy grazier John Macarthur.  In one account disfavourable to the Governor written by Marcus Clarke the following claims regarding Governor Darling's "act of tryanny" of 22 November 1826 are made: "it was given forth that Sudds had died from combined dropsy and bronchitis.  Mr. Wentworth - a native-born Australian barrister, of some eloquence and intense capacity for hating - would not rest satisfied with this explanation, and little by little the facts of the case leaked out"; "the ingenious Darling had placed round their necks spiked iron collars attached by another set of chains to the ankle fetters. The projecting spikes prevented the unhappy men from lying down at ease, and the connecting chains were short enough to prevent them from standing upright. Under the effects of this treatment Sudds had died. Public fury now knew no bounds. Tradesmen put up their shutters as though in mourning for some national calamity. The fiercest denunciations met the Governor on all sides, and he was accused of wilful murder"; after Sudds' death Thompson was taken in a bullock-cart to Penrith gaol, and thence conveyed to "No. 1, Iron-chain-gang party" on Lapstone-hill, being at the face of the Blue Mountains.  At three o’clock on the first day he was taken out and set to work with the gang, having the spiked collar that had killed Sudds on his neck the whole time.  After eight hot days of this work Thompson refused to continue working and was taken to gaol and was finally sent on board the hulks. What became of him seemed unknown to some but he was eventually ordered to rejoin his regiment (Sydney Gazette, 28 March 1829), and was sent back to England in October 1829 (Australian, 23 October 1829).

Having gathered considerable evidence of his own, Wentworth wrote to Sir George Murray, the Secretary of State, and forwarded to him a long bill of indictment against the Governor.  On 8 July 1828, Mr. Stewart, a member of the British House of Commons, rose to move for "papers connected with the case of Joseph Sudds and Patrick Thompson".   The "rascally newspapers" had not been idle either, and "Miles", a correspondent of the Morning Chronicle, took up the cudgels for Mr. Wentworth.  The Morning Chronicle commented severely on the conduct of the Tory Governor of New South Wales. The Tory papers duly retaliated, but eventually Darling moved to resign.  The controversy still persisted, and lasted years after Governor Darling's resignation - with the Whig party clamouring for vengeance, and with "Miles", persistently chronicling all of Darling’s misdeeds in order to seek that Darling be tried for his life.  There was, however, no "trial for murder" and the Government expressed itself fully satisfied with the conduct of Sir Ralph Darling.  Wentworth having got for Governor Major-General Sir Richard Bourke (who was generally liked), turned his attention to other pursuits.  Wentworth published in England a series of pamphlets containing an account of this whole business.

Governor Darling is also said to have "ruthlessly and implacably countered all attempts to establish a theatre in Sydney". He even introduced a law effectively banning the performance of drama. The law stated that no form of public entertainment could take place without approval from the colonial secretary, and Darling ensured that all such applications were rejected. He did permit concerts of music to take place.

His departure for England, upon the ship Hooghly, was greeted by public rejoicing, but his modern biographer has described this display as being "orchestrated by his opponents".

Darling sought to ensure the education of child prisoners, improve the treatment of female convicts, and promote the use of Christian teaching as a means of rehabilitation, and he made efforts to give the indigenous population the protection of British justice. The annual distribution of blankets to Aboriginal people was initiated by him in 1826, originally as rewards to those who assisted in the capture of bushrangers at the request of the Bathurst magistrates.

Later life
Ralph Darling left Australia in 1831, returning to England in 1832. Continuing pressure from political opponents led to the formation of a select committee to examine his actions in Australia, but the inquiry exonerated him, and the day after it concluded, he was knighted by the king in a dramatic display of official favour. The controversy in Australia may have contributed to the fact that he was not given any significant new military or political assignments, but further promotion and various honorific appointments did follow, and he was happy to devote much of his time to raising his young children.

He was given the colonelcy of the 90th Regiment of Foot in 1823, transferring as Colonel to the 41st (Welch) Regiment of Foot in 1837 and to the 69th (South Lincolnshire) Regiment of Foot in 1848, a post he held until his death.

Darling died in Brighton on 2 April 1858 at the age of eighty-six, survived by his widow, three sons and four daughters.

Family

On 13 October 1817, Darling married the 19-year-old Elizabeth Dumaresq, known as Eliza (1798–1868). She was the daughter of Colonel John Dumaresq, a landowner in Shropshire. The marriage was a happy one. Of ten children, four daughters and three sons survived to adulthood.

Eliza's widowed mother Ann Dumaresq was a devout philanthropist, and lived in Cheltenham. Eliza was influenced by Hannah More and Sarah Trimmer. In Australia, she consulted the penal reformer Elizabeth Fry, with reference in particular to female convicts. She was also involved in the establishment of the Female School of Industry at Parramatta.

After Darling's position in New South Wales ended, the family returned to England. They lived at Cheltenham, then Brighton where Darling died in 1858.

Named after Ralph Darling
The following features are named after Ralph Darling or members of his immediate family:
 Darling River
 Darling Harbour
 Darling Downs
 Darling Scarp, also referred to as the Darling Range or Darling Ranges
Darling Causeway, a landform in the Blue Mountains
 Darling Street, the main thoroughfare of Balmain
 The Sydney suburbs of Darlinghurst and Darling Point

The Logan River in South-East Queensland was named the Darling River in 1826 by Captain Patrick Logan, in honour of the then-Governor Darling. However, Darling decided to, "[return] the compliment by renaming the river the Logan, to recognise Logan's enthusiasm and efficiency."

References

Sources
 Duyker, Edward (June 1985), "An Elegant Defence of a Colonial Governor", Australian Rationalist Quarterly, No. 22, p. 14.

Additional resources listed by the Australian Dictionary of Biography
 Historical Records of Australia, Series I, volumes 12–17
 Edw. Smith Hall (1833), Reply in Refutation of the Pamphlets of Lieut.-Gen. R. Darling (London: R. Robinson [sic])
 L. N. Rose (1922), "The Administration of Governor Darling", Journal and Proceedings (Royal Australian Historical Society), vol 8, part 2, pp 49–96 and vol 8, part 3, pp 97–176
 Parliamentary Debates (Great Britain) (3), 29, 30
 Parliamentary Papers (House of Commons, Great Britain), 1828 (538), 1830 (586), 1830–31 (241), 1831–32 (163, 620), 1835 (580)
 A. S. Forbes, Sydney Society in Crown Colony Days (State Library of New South Wales)
 manuscript catalogue under Ralph Darling (State Library of New South Wales)

External links
 Darling's Commission as NSW governor (document scans, discussion)
 Detailed discussion of the Sudds and Thompson case
 
 Colonial Secretary's papers 1822-1877, State Library of Queensland- includes digitised correspondence, reports and letters written by Darling to the Colonial Secretary of New South Wales, including matters relating to the Moreton Bay settlement

|-

|-

|-

1772 births
1858 deaths
Governors of New South Wales
British Army generals
British Army personnel of the Napoleonic Wars
Royal Horse Guards officers
Sherwood Foresters officers
Colony of New South Wales people